Insecure is a 2014 French drama film directed by Marianne Tardieu. It was screened in the ACID section at the 2014 Cannes Film Festival.

Cast 
 Reda Kateb as Chérif Arezki 
 Adèle Exarchopoulos as Jenny 
 Rashid Debbouze as Dedah 
 Moussa Mansaly as Abdou
 Serge Renko as Claude Gilles 
 Alexis Loret as L'enquêteur 
 Hassan N'Dibona as Djim 
 Mohamed Mouloudi as Walid 
 Guillaume Verdier as Fred 
 Medanie Boussaïd as  Sami

References

External links 
 

2014 films
2014 drama films
2010s French-language films
French drama films
2014 directorial debut films
2010s French films